Milan is a neighborhood of the city of New Orleans, Louisiana, U.S.A.  A sub-district of the Central City/Garden District Area, its boundaries as defined by the New Orleans City Planning Commission are: South Claiborne Avenue to the north, Toledano Street and Louisiana Avenue to the east, St. Charles Avenue to the south, and Napoleon Avenue to the west.

Geography

Adjacent neighborhoods
 Broadmoor (north)
 Central City (east)
 Touro (south)
 Uptown (west)
 Freret (west)

Boundaries
The New Orleans City Planning Commission defines the boundaries of Milan as these streets: South Claiborne Avenue, Toledano Street, Louisiana Avenue, St. Charles Avenue, and Napoleon Avenue.

Demographics
As of the census of 2000, there were 7,480 people, 3,175 households, and 1,693 families living in the neighborhood.  The population density was 14,385 /mi2 (5,754 /km2).

As of the census of 2010, there were 5,286 people, 2,372 households, and 1,118 families living in the neighborhood.

See also
 Neighborhoods in New Orleans
 Milan, Italy

References

Neighborhoods in New Orleans